Bestor is an Anglo-American surname, and may refer to:

Arthur E. Bestor (1879–1944), American educator and civic leader
Arthur Bestor (1908–1994), American historian and educational critic
Barbara Bestor, American architect from Los Angeles, California
Charles L. Bestor (born 1924), American composer of electronic and orchestral music
Don Bestor (1889–1970), American bandleader
Kurt Bestor, American composer, arranger, and entertainer
Theodore C. Bestor (1951–2021), American professor of anthropology and Japanese Studies at Harvard University

See also 
 Bester (disambiguation)